Ectoedemia undatae is a moth of the  family Nepticulidae. It was described by Scoble in 1983. It is known from South Africa (it was described from Pretoria).

The larvae feed on Maytenus undulata.

References

Endemic moths of South Africa
Nepticulidae
Moths described in 1983
Taxa named by Malcolm Scoble
Moths of Africa